Islwyn David John (28 October 1933 –  14 January 2009) was a Welsh Anglican priest who was Archdeacon of Carmarthen from 1993 until 1999.

John was educated at St David's College, Lampeter and ordained in 1959. After curacies in Brynamman and Carmarthen he held incumbencies in Penbryn and Llandysul until his Archdeacon’s appointment.

References

1933 births
2009 deaths
Alumni of the University of Wales, Lampeter
Archdeacons of Carmarthen
People from Carmarthenshire